Dr. H. Subrata (born July 4, 1940 in Cirebon, West Java) is an Indonesian media magnate. He is the former of Director General of Press and Graphics.

References

1940 births
Living people
People from Cirebon
Gadjah Mada University alumni